= Xiamen International Stone Fair =

Trade show in Xiamen, China

The Xiamen International Stone Fair is an annual trade show for the stone industry. The exhibition takes place March 16-19 every year in Xiamen, China.
